Karen Margaret Holliday  (née Erikson, born 12 February 1966) is a former New Zealand track cyclist.

Biography
Holliday was born Karen Margaret Erikson in Nelson on 12 February 1966, and was educated at Nelson College for Girls. In 1985, she married Daryl Holliday, and the couple went on to have three children.

Holliday won the world title in the women's points race at the 1990 UCI Track Cycling World Championships in Maebashi, and in doing so became the first New Zealander to win a world cycling title. At the same championship she finished fourth in the road race. Holliday also won the 1990 New Zealand women's road race title.

In the 1991 New Year Honours, Holliday was appointed a Member of the Order of the British Empire, for services to cycling. She was named as New Zealand sportswoman of the year for 1990 at the Halberg Awards.

She was inducted into the New Zealand Sports Hall of Fame in 1997.

References

1966 births
Living people
People from Nelson, New Zealand
New Zealand female cyclists
UCI Track Cycling World Champions (women)
New Zealand Members of the Order of the British Empire
People educated at Nelson College for Girls
New Zealand track cyclists
20th-century New Zealand women